Adam Clarke (176226 August 1832) was a British Methodist theologian who served three times as President of the Wesleyan Methodist Conference (1806–07, 1814–15 and 1822–23). A biblical scholar, he published an influential Bible commentary among other works. He was a Wesleyan.

Biography

Early life and education
Clarke was born in 1760 or 1762, in the townland of Moybeg Kirley near Tobermore in Northern Ireland.

His father, an Anglican, was a village schoolmaster and farmer; his mother was a Presbyterian. His childhood consisted of a series of life-threatening mishaps. After receiving a very limited education he was apprenticed to a linen manufacturer, but, finding the employment uncongenial, he resumed school-life at the institution founded by Wesley at Kingswood.

In 1778, at the age of fourteen, Rev. John Wesley invited him to become a pupil in the Methodist seminary lately established at Kingswood, Bristol. In 1779, he converted to Methodism after listening to a preacher.

Career
In 1782, at nineteen he became an itinerant preacher, appointed to the circuit of Bradford, Wiltshire, until 1805. He afterwards resided chiefly in London, and devoted much of his time to literary research.

While second to none in the labours of the ministry, Clarke was a most assiduous scholar. First the classics engaged his especial attention, then the early Christian fathers, and then Oriental writers; Hebrew, Syriac, Arabic, Persian, Sanskrit, and other Eastern tongues, with the literature which they represented, being among the subjects of his study. Natural science was a favourite subject, and he had an interest in what are called the occult sciences. He contributed to the Eclectic Review from the date of its establishment in 1804, and rendered much literary assistance to the British and Foreign Bible Society.

In 1807 he received the diploma of M.A. from the university and King's College, Aberdeen. In 1808 the University of Aberdeen conferred on Clarke the honorary degree of LL.D., the university highest academic honour.

In 1815, Clarke removed and resided in an estate in Millbrook, for several years. In 1823, Clarke removed to London and afterwards to Haydon Hall, where he resided until his death.

Ministry
As a preacher, he soon became remarkably popular. He rose to high rank in the Wesleyan body. Clarke was thrice President of the Conference in 1806, 1814 and 1822. At first he was moved from place to place, according to the Wesleyan arrangement, being engaged at various times in Ireland, Scotland, the Channel Islands, and Shetland (1826). Clarke was a preacher of rare power and gifts and particularly in his latter years, he preached to crowded churches.

Rosetta Stone
Clarke was an amateur historian and scholar, and was invited by Brandt, secretary of the Royal Society of Antiquarians to see the newly acquired Rosetta Stone. At that time in 1803, the writing and composition of the stone had not been translated, nor had all three languages been positively identified. Clarke proposed that the stone was basalt, a theory which while recently was found to be incorrect was thought to be correct until the late 1900s when better scanning equipment was developed. He also proposed that the third language was Coptic (it was actually Demotic, an earlier form of the Egyptian language that would become Coptic), a clue which was used by Jean-François Champollion who successfully completed the translation in 1822.

Memberships
He was elected a member of six of the most learned societies of his day. He was a member of the British and Foreign Bible Society, Fellow of the American Antiquarian Society in 1816, a Member of the Royal Irish Academy, an Associate of the Geological Society of London, a Fellow of the Royal Asiatic Society, and a member of the American Historical Institute.

Death
Clarke died from an attack of cholera, 26 Aug. 1832. There is a memorial to Adam Clarke in Portrush, Antrim, County Antrim.

Theological contribution

Commentary on the Bible
He is chiefly remembered for writing a commentary on the Bible which took him 40 years to complete and which was a primary Methodist theological resource for two centuries. Comments on this work are mixed, but recognize its erudition. By himself he produced nearly half as much material as the scores of scholars who collaborated on the twelve-volume The Interpreters' Bible. His commentary, particularly that on Revelation, identified the Catholic Church with the Antichrist.

Clarke followed Wesley in opposing a Calvinistic scheme of salvation, preferring instead the Wesleyan-Arminian positions regarding predestination, prevenient grace, the offer of justification to all persons, the possibility of entire sanctification, and assurance of salvation.

Theological views
As a theologian, Clarke reinforced the teachings of Methodist founder John Wesley. He taught that the Bible provides a complete interpretation of God's nature and will. He considered Scripture itself a miracle of God's grace that "takes away the veil of darkness and ignorance."

Perhaps his most controversial position regarded the eternal Sonship of Jesus. Clarke did not believe it biblically faithful to affirm this doctrine, maintaining that prior to the Incarnation, Jesus was "unoriginated". Otherwise, according to Clarke, he would be subordinate to God and therefore not fully divine. This was important to Clarke because he felt that Jesus' divinity was crucial to understanding the atonement.

Clarke's view was opposed by many Methodists, notably Richard Watson. Watson and his allies argued that Clarke's position jeopardized the integrity of the doctrine of the Trinity. Clarke's christological view was rejected in large part by Methodist theologians in favour of the traditional perspective.

Support for abolitionism
He joined with other ministers in being an early critic of slavery. In his commentary of Isaiah 58:6, he writes :

"Let the oppressed go free – How can any nation pretend to fast or worship God at all, or dare to profess that they believe in the existence of such a Being, while they carry on the slave trade, and traffic in the souls, blood, and bodies, of men! O ye most flagitious of knaves, and worst of hypocrites, cast off at once the mask of religion; and deepen not your endless perdition by professing the faith of our Lord Jesus Christ, while ye continue in this traffic!".

Works
Here are important books written by Clarke. There are also : three volumes of Sermons, besides several single discourses and detached pieces ; and many anonymous articles in the Classical Journal, in the Eclectic Review, and in various other respectable journals. To these may be added the new edition for the Record Commission of Thomas Rymer's Foedera, in folio, of which he saw the first volume, and part of the second, through the press. The edition was abandoned because of dissatisfaction with his efforts.

In literature
In 1834, Lydia Sigourney published her poem .

The poetical illustration  by Letitia Elizabeth Landon is based on an engraving of an incident in Dr Clarke's life painted by A. Mosses. It is included in Fisher's Drawing Room Scrap Book, 1836 and, as the notes attached refer to Liverpool, it presumably occurred late in his life.

Notes and references

Citations

Sources

Further reading

External links
 Adam Clarke's O.T. & N.T. Commentary

1760s births
1832 deaths
19th-century Christian biblical scholars
Arminian ministers
Arminian theologians
Bible commentators
British abolitionists
British biblical scholars
British Christian theologians
Members of the American Antiquarian Society
Methodist abolitionists
Methodist biblical scholars
Methodist ministers from Northern Ireland
Methodist theologians
Presidents of the Methodist Conference